Miguel Durán Navia (born 2 September 1995) is a Spanish swimmer. He competed in the men's 400 metre freestyle event at the 2016 Summer Olympics.

References

External links
 

1995 births
Living people
Olympic swimmers of Spain
Swimmers at the 2016 Summer Olympics
Swimmers at the 2018 Mediterranean Games
Place of birth missing (living people)
Mediterranean Games bronze medalists for Spain
Mediterranean Games medalists in swimming
Spanish male freestyle swimmers